The 2016–17 season was Akhisarspor's 5th consecutive season in the Süper Lig.

Squad
Players who made at least one appearance in the league or cup during the season.

Competitions

Süper Lig

Table

Results summary

Results by round

Turkish Cup

References

Akhisarspor
Akhisarspor seasons